Chahkanduk may refer to:
 Chahkanduk, alternate name of Chahkandak
 Chahkanduk, Birjand
 Chahkanduk, Sarbisheh

See also
 Chahkand (disambiguation)